Home Rule is a 19th-century gold rush town in rural New South Wales, Australia. It is 290 km to Sydney.

On 9 July 1872 The Maitland Mercury and Hunter River General Advertiser reported that "the scene at Home Rule is a busy one, and very few people can form an idea of it unless they go and see for themselves. A township is in rapid formation, and streets are being made close to the golden holes. One digger refused £500 for a share in a claim on the right spot. Everyone appears sanguine. The storekeepers and publicans look remarkably pleasant, as if they anticipated rich harvests, and even John Chinaman smiles graciously on meeting you. It would almost be an impossibility to give an account of the different claims, as they extend for miles; and until the dispute as to the frontage and block system is settled, many men will prefer to be idle."

References list

External links
 State Library of New South Wales. Photographs of Canadian Lead and Home Rule. Retrieved 6 June 2014.
 The Sydney Morning Herald 28 November 1873, page 3. Article regarding Gulgong and Home Rule. Retrieved 6 June 2014.

Towns in New South Wales